The Preston & Northcote Community Hospital (often referred  to as PANCH) was a former hospital located in Preston, Victoria, Australia, opened in 1958 and relocated to the Northern Hospital in Epping in February 1998. PANCH was located on the corner of Bell and Hotham Streets. The site was sold off in April 1999, and part of the  site is now occupied by Bell City Centre which is a residential facility, student accommodation and host of two hotels a part of the Mantra Group.

Fixtures from the hospital were removed by volunteers to help rebuild a community hospital in Suai, East Timor. The hospital's former operating theatres were used for a play on genetic engineering named The Teratology Project in 2002.

A new facility called the PANCH Health Service was established in 2003 by the State Government to address a shortage of medical services in the area. This State Government health service, which is located opposite the old PANCH site, is named out of nostalgia and is not directly connected with the former Preston & Northcote Community Hospital.

References

External links
Darebin Heritage - PANCH Preston and Northcote Hospital

Hospital buildings completed in 1958
Hospitals in Melbourne
Defunct hospitals in Victoria (Australia)
Hospitals established in 1958
1998 disestablishments in Australia
1958 establishments in Australia